Benagéber is a municipality in the comarca of Los Serranos in the Valencian Community, Spain.

See also
Sierra de Utiel

References

Los Serranos
Municipalities in the Province of Valencia